Elysius meridionalis is a moth of the family Erebidae. It was described by Walter Rothschild in 1917. It is found in Brazil.

References

meridionalis
Moths described in 1917
Moths of South America